Meru Twin Towers, also Meru Church Towers, or Meru Destiny Towers, is a real estate development, planned in the town of Meru, the county seat of Meru County in the Eastern part of Kenya. The mixed use twin towers are owned by the developers, the Jesus House of Praise International Church.

Location
The location sits immediately south of River Kathita, to the east of the road, as you approach Meru from Embu. The coordinates of the building are: 0°02'32.0"N, 37°39'13.0"E
(Latitude:0.042222; Longitude:37.653611).

Overview
The building is expected to comprise retail stores, office spaces, serviced apartments, hotels, a gymnasium and a swimming pool. Two basement floors are expected to accommodate up to 200 parked automobiles. In addition, there will be Church halls, conference facilities, meeting rooms and related facilities, including restaurants, and a supermarket.

The project has been cleared by the Water Resource Users Association (WRUA) and has been endorsed by Kevin Musiega, of Lakers Consultancy Limited, who carried out the Environmental And Social Impact Assessment Study (EASIA Study).

Construction costs
As of November 2018, construction costs are budgeted at KSh4.52 billion (US$45.2 million).

See also
 List of counties in Kenya

References

External links
 We’ll bar hate leaders from using church for political gain - Bishop As at 30 June 2016.

Buildings and structures in Kenya
Meru County
Meru
Skyscraper office buildings in Kenya